Katherine Olivia "Kate" Sessions (November 8, 1857 – March 24, 1940) was an American botanist, horticulturalist, and landscape architect closely associated with San Diego, California, and known as the "Mother of Balboa Park."

Early life
Sessions was born in San Francisco, California, and educated in Oakland. At the age of six, she moved with her family to a farm next to Lake Merritt. She attended the University of California, Berkeley in 1881 with a degree in natural science. While attending a San Francisco business school, at the request of a friend, she moved to San Diego in 1883 to work as an eighth grade teacher and vice principal at Russ School (now San Diego High School). She worked at the school for over a year before she left due to health problems.

Adult life
In San Diego, Sessions quickly moved on to her true interest, the cultivation of plants. In 1885, she purchased a nursery; within a few years she was the owner of a flower shop as well as growing fields and nurseries in Coronado, Pacific Beach, and Mission Hills. The Mission Hills Nursery, which she founded in 1910 and sold to her employees the Antonicelli brothers in 1926, is still in operation.

In 1892 Sessions struck a deal with the City of San Diego to lease  of land in Balboa Park (then called City Park) as her growing fields. In return, she agreed to plant 100 trees a year in the mostly barren park, as well as 300 trees a year in other parts of San Diego. This arrangement left the park with an array of cypress, pine, oak, pepper trees and eucalyptus grown in her gardens from seeds imported from around the world; virtually all of the older trees still seen in the park were planted by her. Among many other plant introductions, she is credited with importing and popularizing the jacaranda, now very familiar in the city. She also collected, propagated, and introduced many California native plants to the horticulture trade and into gardens. In 1900, she took a trip to Baja California to find a palm tree not native in San Diego to be planted at the park. She would also later take a seven-month trip through Europe where she collected multiple plant varieties that she eventually helped plant in the park.

Together with Alfred D. Robinson she co-founded the San Diego Floral Association in 1907; it is the oldest garden club in Southern California. The garden club was influential in teaching San Diegans how to grow ornamental and edible plants, at a time when most San Diego landscaping consisted of dirt and sagebrush.

Sessions worked with architect Hazel Wood Waterman on the garden design of a single-family home near Balboa Park built by San Diego socialite Alice Lee.

Personal life
Sessions never married. Sessions maintained a close and lifelong friendship with Alice Eastwood and may have been a member of the LGBTQ+ community. Sessions lived to be 82, when she died in San Diego on March 24, 1940. She is interred in Mount Hope Cemetery.

Honors

Her work with plant introduction, as well as her extensive writing on the subject, won her international recognition. At the California Pacific International Exposition on September 22, 1935, the day was dedicated to Sessions, where she was named the "Mother of Balboa Park". In 1939, she became the first woman to receive the prestigious Frank N. Meyer medal of the American Genetic Association.

In the San Diego area, the Kate Sessions Elementary school in Pacific Beach bears her name, as does Kate O. Sessions Memorial Park on Mount Soledad, located less than a mile from the school and constructed only a few years later.

A bronze statue of Sessions, dedicated in 1998, is situated in a prominent location in Balboa Park, in the southwest corner of Sefton Plaza, near the Sixth Avenue entrance to the park.

In 2006, the Women's Museum of California inducted Sessions into the San Diego County Women's Hall of Fame, under the title of Trailblazer.

In popular culture
A 2013 children's picture book, The Tree Lady: The True Story of How One Tree-Loving Woman Changed a City Forever, tells the story of Kate's life, education, and contribution to San Diego civic life.

Selected works

References

Bibliography

External links
 Kate O. Sessions Collection 1891-1940,  San Diego City Clerk's Archives
 Kate Sessions Collection 1876-1940, San Diego History Center
 Finding aid to the Kate Sessions Collection, Online Archive of California.
 The San Diego Natural History Museum Research Library houses a significant collection of Kate Sessions' papers.

1857 births
1940 deaths
American horticulturists
American landscape and garden designers
American landscape architects
American designers
Scientists from California
Women botanists
Women landscape architects
Women horticulturists and gardeners
American women architects
California people in design
Landscape design history of the United States
Botanists active in California
History of San Diego
San Diego High School alumni
University of California, Berkeley alumni
Balboa Park (San Diego)
People from San Diego
People from San Francisco
Burials at Mount Hope Cemetery (San Diego)
19th-century American architects
20th-century American architects
19th-century American botanists
20th-century American botanists
19th-century American women scientists
20th-century American women scientists